is a train station in Shiranuka, Shiranuka District, Hokkaidō, Japan.

Lines
Hokkaido Railway Company
Nemuro Main Line Station K47

Adjacent stations

Railway stations in Hokkaido Prefecture
Railway stations in Japan opened in 1901